Dashrath Puri is a small colony consisting of around 1000 houses situated on Dabri-Palam road in South West Delhi, India. Currently this colony comes under Dwarka (Earlier it was under Nasirpur constituency which is dissolved due to delimitation) and West Delhi (Earlier it was under Outer Delhi parliamentary constituency which is dissolved due to delimitation).
Schools : Jindal Public School
Coaching Centre : A.K Institute of Studies, Street no 4 Dabri Village
Pitajis Bridhashram at B-1/1 near Shani mandir houses old and destitute patients. Bridhashram also runs free allopathic, homeopathic and dentist OPDs in dispensary.

Neighbourhood

Dashrath puri is located close to other colonies of New Delhi such as Janakpuri, Vikaspuri, Dabri Village, Dwarka Sub City as well as the Indira Gandhi International Airport. IT city of India, Gurgaon is at a distance of half an hour from Dashrath puri.

Politics

Dashrath Puri's MLA is Vinay Mishra of Aam Aadmi Party and Member of Parliament is Parvesh Verma of BJP.

People

Although it is a very small colony people from different parts of India live here. The population mainly consists of people from India Punjab, Haryana, Uttarakhand, Rajasthan,  Uttar Pradesh, Bihar, Himachal Pradesh,Tamil Nadu, Kerala, West Bengal.

Accessibility 

 Dashrath puri has a well-connected road network. 
 Nearest metro station is Dashrath Puri.
 Nearest railway station is Palam and Delhi Cantt. railway station.
 Major DTC Bus Routes touches Dashrath puri are 721, 761, 778, 801, RL-75, RL-77, RL-79 etc. In addition to this there are other RTVs & Metro feeder vehicles are operating with lower frequencies.
DTC Bus Route no. 721 to ISBT Kashmiri Gate, 772 and 801 to Uttam Nagar, Janakpuri, Vikaspuri, Peeragarhi, Rohini, Pitam Pura & Azad Pur & RL-77 to New Delhi railway station respectively are the most frequent bus services from Dashrath puri.

Metro station

Dashrath Puri is a functional metro station in the third phase of the Magenta line from Janakpuri (west) to Botanical Garden Noida.

See also
 Districts of Delhi 
 Neighbourhoods of Delhi

References

Neighbourhoods in Delhi
Cities and towns in West Delhi district